The 1985 Brownlow Medal was the 58th year the award was presented to the player adjudged the fairest and best player during the Victorian Football League (VFL) home and away season. Brad Hardie of the Footscray Football Club won the medal by polling twenty-two votes during the 1985 VFL season.

Leading votegetters 
* The player was ineligible to win the medal due to suspension by the VFL Tribunal during the year.

References 

1985 in Australian rules football
1985